Belanda Hitam (from Indonesian meaning "Black Dutchmen", known in Javanese as Landa (Walanda) Ireng) were a group of African (primarily Ashanti and other Akan peoples) recruits in the Royal Netherlands East Indies Army during the colonial period.

Between 1831 and 1872, over three thousand Africans were recruited from the Dutch Gold Coast for service as colonial troops in the Dutch East Indies. This recruitment was in fact an emergency measure, as the Dutch army lost thousands of European soldiers and a much larger number of "native" soldiers in the Java War against Prince Diponegoro.

History 
Following the independence of Belgium in 1830, the Netherlands’ population was considerably diminished, making colonial combat losses more difficult to replace. Furthermore, the Dutch wanted the number of locally recruited soldiers in the East Indies Army to be limited to roughly half the total strength, to ensure the loyalty of native forces. It was also hoped that Akan soldiers would be more resistant to the tropical climate and tropical diseases of the Dutch East Indies than Dutch soldiers.

The soldiers from the Gold Coast were first recruited in Elmina. Of the 150 that were enlisted, 44 were descendants of Euro-African families in Elmina. They were deployed in 1832 in southern Sumatra. The West Africans proved less resistant to the climate than had been hoped, but their physique and general appearance as soldiers impressed the Sumatran population. In 1836 a further group of 88 Akan soldiers arrived in the Dutch East Indies. The Dutch government then decided to recruit from the Ashanti people.

In the autumn of 1836 Major General Jan Verveer undertook a mission to the King of Ashanti. On November 1, 1836, after he had arrived in Elmina, General Verveer departed with a retinue of about 900 people (the majority porters carrying provisions and gifts) to the capital of the Ashanti Empire, Comassie (Kumasi). After lengthy negotiations, an agreement was concluded with King Kwaku Dua. In Kumasi, a recruiting branch office was established by Jacob Huydecoper, a Dutch government official from Elmina of mixed Dutch-African descent. Kwaku Dua also sent two princes, Kwasi Boachi and Kwame Poku Boachi, to Verveer in the Netherlands for training. Their subsequent careers are described by Arthur Japin in his novel The Two Hearts of Kwasi Boachi (1997).

Because the British had abolished slavery, a somewhat cautious approach to recruitment was taken. The Ashanti king offered slaves and prisoners of war from the surrounding regions, for Dutch colonial service. However they nominally put themselves forward as voluntary recruits. As Dutch military service personnel they were entitled to receive pay. However British objections in 1842 led to discontinuation of this relatively successful recruitment. In 1855 enrollment resumed due to the positive experiences of West African soldiers in the Dutch East Indies.  This renewed recruitment was now on a strictly voluntary basis.

End of African recruitment 
A total of several thousand African soldiers "with a Dutch name", were shipped to the Dutch East Indies. The Treaty of Sumatra in 1871 gave the Netherlands possessions on the Gold Coast to the British. This terminated the recruitment of Africans for the Royal Netherlands East Indies Army. On April 20, 1872, the last ship with African recruits left for Java. There were however two further attempts to recruit black volunteers for the Colonial Army. Between 1876 and 1879 thirty American black recruits were hired for the KNIL. In 1890 there was an attempt to obtain recruits from Liberia. A total of 189 Liberians went to Java, but this group became almost entirely dissatisfied with failed promises and returned to Liberia in 1892. Even without the recruitment of African soldiers, the KNIL still had soldiers of African origin in its army long after the 1890s. These African and Indo-African soldiers were the offspring of the Africans that the Dutch shipped from the Dutch Gold Coast between 1830 and 1872.

See also 
 Elmina Java Museum
 Askari
 Mardijker people
 Colonial troops
The Two Hearts of Kwasi Boachi

Sources

 Ineke van Kessel, 'The black Dutchmen. African soldiers in the Netherlands East Indies'. In: Merchants, missionaries & migrants. 300 years of Dutch-Ghanaian relations. Amsterdam, KIT Publishers, 2002. Online version
  W.M.J. van Kessel Zwarte Hollanders; Afrikaanse soldaten in Nederlands-Indië (2005; KIT Publishers)
  J. Verhoog, 'De werving van Westafrikanen voor het Nederlands-Indische leger, 1831-1872', in: Mededelingen van de Sectie Militaire Geschiedenis Landmachtstaf, deel 12 (1989) 5-26.

External links
 Stichting Indo-Afrikaans Kontakt

Dutch East Indies
History of Ghana
Military history of the Netherlands
African diaspora history
African diaspora in Asia
African diaspora in the Netherlands